Oluwatoyin Temitayo Ogundipe (born 31 May 1960) is a Nigerian academic and a professor of botany. He served as the 12th vice chancellor of the University of Lagos from November 2017 to November 2022.

Early life and education
Ogundipe was born on 31 May 1960. He attended the University of Ife (now Obafemi Awolowo University) where he obtained a Bachelor of Science (B.Sc.) degree in Botany. He holds a master's degree in botany from the University of Ife and doctorate degree (Ph.D.) from the same university. He then obtained a master's degree in Business Administration from the University of Lagos.

Career
Ogundipe began his academic career at the University of Lagos as a lecturer where he rose to the rank of professor of Botany in 2002. He was Dean, School of Postgraduate Studies from August 2007 to July 2011 and Director, Academic Planning Unit from April 2012 to April 2016.

He was appointed as the vice-chancellor of the University of Lagos in November 2017. Until his appointment in November, he was the deputy vice-chancellor of the University of Lagos.

Ogundipe was removed as the Vice-Chancellor of the University of Lagos by the university's governing council following accusations of financial impropriety and gross misconduct. He was however reinstated by President Muhammadu Buhari based on the recommendation of an investigative panel which found that the removal was not done with due process.

Personal life
Ogundipe is married with three children.

References

Academic staff of the University of Lagos
Obafemi Awolowo University alumni
Nigerian biologists
University of Lagos alumni
1960 births
Living people
Vice-Chancellors of the University of Lagos
Fellows of the African Academy of Sciences